Eshbol  is a moshav in southern Israel. Located in the north-western Negev near Netivot and Rahat, it falls under the jurisdiction of Merhavim Regional Council.

History
Eshbol was established in 1954 as a farm by members of the "Eshbol" organisation who were immigrants from Iran.

References

Iranian-Jewish culture in Israel
Moshavim
Populated places established in 1954
Populated places in Southern District (Israel)
1954 establishments in Israel